Francesco de Martini (9 August 1903 – 26 November 1981) was an Italian officer of the Military Information Service (Servizio Informazioni Militari, or SIM) in Eritrea, when the Allies invaded Italian East Africa during World War II. He  enlisted as a private in the Italian army in 1923, and left active service as brigadier general and the most decorated soldier of the Italian army during World War II.

Historical background

Many Italians fought a guerrilla war in Italian East Africa after the surrender at Gondar of the last regular Italian forces in November 1941.  They fought in the hope of an Italian victory with the help of Rommel in Egypt and in the Mediterranean, that would originate a possible return of the Axis in Eastern Africa.

Early life
De Martini was born in Damascus, which was then part of the Ottoman Empire, son of Antonio de Martini, an Italian engineer who worked at the construction of the never completed Berlin-Baghdad railway line and Sofia Mokadié. He accomplished his studies at the National College in Lebanon.

Enlistment in Italian army
In 1923 he was conscripted by the Italian army and sent to Rome to train in the newly created tank regiment.

In 1927 Prince Luigi Amedeo, Duke of the Abruzzi sent as a gift an Italian tank Fiat 3000 to Ras Tafari. De Martini had the task to deliver and train the Ethiopians in the use of it.

After defending with his tank Ras Tafari from a coup d'etat organised by the followers of Empress Zewditu, he was appointed as commanding officer of the imperial guard.

On request of the Italian High Command he spent 8 years in Addis Ababa, joining again the Italian army in Eritrea, just before the invasion of Ethiopia.

He fought in the Second Italo-Ethiopian War with the "Banda irregolare di Beilul", an irregular colonial band, and was awarded with a silver medal for bravery on the field and promoted officer by war merit.

Service during World War II
After being commissioned as a lieutenant, De Martini was again assigned to Ethiopia as part of the XI Colonial Brigade to fight against the Ethiopian guerrillas and was awarded with a bronze medal.

Immediately after the start of the war the Italian Military Information Service called him back since he could fluently speak Arabic, Turkish and Amharic. 

In the first months of 1941 he fought in the East African Campaign in Assab and Dankalia (southern Eritrea), where he was captured when severely ill with malaria by a British patrol, but a week later he managed to escape from the hospital of the Dessié.

He decided, in accordance with his commander Colonel Alessandro Bruttini to go to Saudi Arabia in order to report the situation to Rome through the Italian consulate in Jeddah.

Returning to Eritrea, on 1 August 1941 Lieutenant De Martini blew up a British ammunition dump in Massaua (Eritrea).

After crossing the Red Sea in the motorboat Zam Zam, De Martini fled to Saudi Arabia. He made contact with the Italian consulate in that country, and from the Yemeni coast organized a group of Eritrean sailors (with small boats called sambuco) in order to identify, and notify Rome with his radio, of the Royal Navy movements throughout the Red Sea.

Major Max Harari, head of the British intelligence, offered a reward for his capture. On 1 August 1942, while attempting to come back to Eritrea, De Martini was captured on Dahlak Island by sailors from HMAS Arpha and imprisoned in Sudan.

After the war

De Martini returned to Italy on 19 January 1946 after almost four years in a British POW camp, and rejoined the SIM. His first task was to contact the Ethiopian Ambassador in Washington, during a brief visit to Naples, with the purpose of reestablishing diplomatic relations between Italy and Ethiopia.

After the end of World War II, Lieutenant Francesco De Martini received the Gold Medal of Military Valour, was also awarded with "Ordine Militare d'Italia"  and received a second promotion to captain for war merits. He died in Grottaferrata in 1981, aged 78.

See also
Rosa Dainelli
Italian guerrilla war in Ethiopia

Notes

Bibliography

 Cernuschi, Enrico. La resistenza sconosciuta in Africa Orientale Rivista Storica, dicembre 1994.(Rivista Italiana Difesa)
 

De Martini
History of Eritrea
Ethiopia in World War II
De Martini
1903 births
1981 deaths
People from Damascus
Italian expatriates in the Ottoman Empire